In geometry, the gyroelongated square pyramid is one of the Johnson solids. As its name suggests, it can be constructed by taking a square pyramid and "gyroelongating" it, which in this case involves joining a square antiprism to its base.

Applications
The Gyroelongated square pyramid represents the capped square antiprismatic molecular geometry:

Dual polyhedron 

The dual of the gyroelongated square pyramid has 9 faces: 4 kites, 1 square and 4 pentagonal.

See also 
 Gyroelongated square bipyramid

External links
 

Johnson solids
Pyramids and bipyramids